The Kings or Judges (from the Latin iudices and the Sardinian , "judges," the title of the Byzantine officials left behind when Imperial power receded in the West) of the Arborea were the local rulers of the west of Sardinia during the Middle Ages. Theirs was the longest-lasting judgedom, surviving as an independent state until the fifteenth century.

House of Lacon Gunale 
Gonario I (c. 1015 – c. 1038)
Barisone I (c. 1038 – c. 1060)
Marianus I (c. 1060 – c. 1070)
Orzocorre I (c. 1070 – c. 1100)
Torbeno  (c. 1100)
Orzocorre II (c. 1100 – c. 1122)
Comita I

House of Lacon Serra 
Gonario II
Constantine I (c. 1101 – 1131)
Comita II (1131 – 1147)
Orzocorre III, co-ruler
Barisone II (1147 – 1185)
Hugh I (1185 – 1211), in opposition to Peter until 1192
Peter I (1185 – 1214), in opposition to Hugh until 1192
Peter II (1211 – 1241), sole ruler from 1217
Barisone III (1214 – 1217)

House of Bas Serra (Baux Serra) 
Marianus II (1241 – 1297)
William of Capraia (1241 – 1264) 
Nicholas of Capraia (1264 – 1274)
Anselm of Capraia (1274 – 1287)
John (1297 – 1304)
Andrew (1304 – 1308)
Marianus III (1308 – 1321)
Hugh II (1321 – 1336)
Peter III (1336 – 1347)
Marianus IV (1347 – 1376)
Hugh III (1376 – 1383)

House of Doria Bas (Doria Baux) 
Frederick (1383 – 1387)
Eleanor (1383 – 1387), Regent first time
Marianus V (1387 – 1407)
Eleanor (1387 – 1402), Regent second time

House of Narbonne 
William (1407 – 1410)
Leonardo Cubello (regent: 1407 – 1410)
Sold to Crown of Aragon. Following were titular rulers.
Leonardo Cubello (1410 – 1427), Margrave of Oristano and Count of Goceano
Antonio Cubello (1427 – 1463), Margrave of Oristano and Count of Goceano
Salvador Cubello (1463 – 1470), Margrave of Oristano and Count of Goceano
Leonardo de Alagona (1470, claimed the positions of Margrave of Oristano and Count of Goceano, raised a revolt
Rights passed to the House of Alagona, lords of Sastago and Pina, whom the Aragonese deposed as result of the revolt.

 
History of Sardinia